Mokambo is a city of the Democratic Republic of the Congo. It borders Zambia. As of 2012, it had an estimated population of 23,663.

References 

Populated places in Haut-Katanga Province